Amii Stewart is a studio album by Amii Stewart released in 1983 which includes hit single "Working Late Tonight" as well as covers of two songs from Donna Summer's unreleased 1981 album I'm a Rainbow. In 2015, Funky Town Grooves announced they would be reissuing the album on CD for the first time ever.

Cover version
Turkish singer Ajda Pekkan covered "Working Late Tonight" in Turkish the same year as "Uykusuz her gece" ("Every Night Without Sleep") on her album Süperstar 83.

Track listing

Side A:
"Working Late Tonight" (Mario Capuano, Simon Boswell)- 4:04
"Nobody but Me" (Leslie Mándoki) - 3:30
"Sweet Emotion" (Pete Bellotte, Sylvester Levay) - 3:47
 Originally recorded by Donna Summer for her unreleased I'm a Rainbow album (1981, released 1996).
"Don't Ask Me Why" (Leslie Mándoki) - 3:35
"Take a Heart" (Miki Dallon) - 3:28

Side B:
"Beginning of the End" (Gerard McMahon, Tom Bahlen) - 3:56
"You to Me" (Pete Bellotte, Sylvester Levay) - 4:41
 Originally recorded by Donna Summer for her unreleased I'm a Rainbow album (1981, released 1996).
"Say Goodbye to Love" (Simon Boswell) - 4:02
"Once Again" (Vili Lakatos) - 3:43

Personnel
 Amii Stewart - lead vocals, backing vocals
 Corrado Rustici - guitar
 Simon Boswell - guitar, synthesizer
 Vili Lakatos - piano, synthesizer
 Stefano Senesi - synthesizer
 Aldo Banfi - Synclavier
 Dario Massari - Fairlight programming
 Jeremy Meek - bass
 James Lane - drums
 Mel Collins - saxophone
 Charles Cannon, Douglas Meakin, Simona Pirone - backing vocals
 Leandro Leandri, Raffaele Cricchi, Sandro Secondino, Vincent Messina - fingersnaps on "Take a Heart"

Production
 Simon Boswell - Producer, Arranger, Mixing
 Leandro Leandri - Engineer, Mixing
 Raffaele Chicchi, Sandro Secondino - Assistant Engineers
 Guido Di Toma - Mastering (half-speed)

References

1983 albums
Amii Stewart albums